Baltazar Costa Rodrigues de Oliveira (born 6 May 2000), better known as Batata, is a Brazilian professional footballer who plays as a midfielder for the Swiss club FC Sion.

Career
Batata began playing senior football with Vila Nova Futebol Clube in the Campeonato Goiano in 2018.

On 17 May 2017, Batata transferred to FC Sion in Switzerland. He made his professional debut for Sion in a 2–1 Swiss Super League loss to FC Lugano on 22 July 2018.

Personal life
Batata's real first name is Baltazar after his father, but prefers to go by his childhood nickname (meaning potato in Portuguese).

References

External links
 
 SFL Profile
 FC Sion Profile

2000 births
Living people
Sportspeople from Goiás
Brazilian footballers
Association football midfielders
Swiss Super League players
FC Sion players
Vila Nova Futebol Clube players
Brazilian expatriate footballers
Brazilian expatriate sportspeople in Switzerland
Expatriate footballers in Switzerland